WHIM may refer to:

The Warm–hot intergalactic medium in astrophysics
WHIM syndrome, Wart, Hypogammaglobulinemia, Infection, and Myelokathexis syndrome

 Callsigns

WHIM-LP, a low-power radio station (99.5 FM) licensed to serve Hialeah Gardens, Florida, United States
WHIM (defunct), a defunct radio station (1110 AM) licensed to serve East Providence, Rhode Island, United States
WQOS (AM), a radio station (1080 AM) licensed to serve Coral Gables, Florida, which held the call sign WHIM from 2010 to 2018
WNDO, a radio station (1520 AM) licensed to serve Apopka, Florida, which held the call sign WHIM from 1998 to 2010
Former callsign (1947–92, 1993–95) of WPMZ, a radio station (1110 AM) licensed to serve East Providence, Rhode Island
Former callsign (1995–98) of WWRI (AM), a radio station (1450 AM) licensed to serve West Warwick, Rhode Island

See also
Whim (disambiguation)